The Seafair Cup (branded as the HomeStreet Bank Cup for sponsorship reasons, and formerly the Albert Lee Appliance Cup), is an H1 Unlimited hydroplane boat race held annually in late July and early August on Lake Washington in Seattle, Washington. The race is the main attraction of the annual Seafair festival. Seattle has hosted the Seafair Cup consecutively since 1951. The event was part of the APBA Gold Cup for the following years: 1951 to 1955, 1957 to 1959, 1962, 1965, 1967, 1974, 1981, and 1985.

History

Seattle's history of unlimited hydroplane racing dates back to July 1950, when it was announced that the APBA Gold Cup was leaving Detroit in favor of Seattle. Slo-mo-shun IV, owned by Stanley Sayres, won the Gold Cup race in Detroit that year. At that time, the Gold Cup was run at the home of the winner, so for 1951, the Gold Cup was coming to Seattle. The race was added to the Seafair festival. When the Gold Cup left Seattle for Detroit in 1955, local officials decided to hold a race of their own, and the Seafair Cup was born.

The 1951 Seattle race was co-sponsored through 1960 by the Seattle Yacht Club. Greater Seattle, Inc. (later renamed Seafair, Inc.) became the sole sponsor of the race, starting in 1961. The Seafair Boat Club, which administers the Seattle race on Seafair's behalf, was organized in 1975.

Lou Fageol won the very first Seattle race driving Stan Sayres' Slo-mo-shun V. The Emerald City has hosted the Unlimiteds every year from 1951 to 2019. In 2020 and 2021, the event was cancelled because of the COVID-19 pandemic. The next unlimited hydroplane race in Seattle is planned for 2022.

Past Seattle Unlimited Hydroplane Winners 
The following boats and drivers won in Seattle:

References

External links
Seafair Cup website
H1 Unlimited website

Annual sporting events in the United States
Culture of Seattle
H1 Unlimited
Motorboat races
Recurring sporting events established in 1951
Sports competitions in Seattle